Hriday Narayan Singh Patel is an Indian politician of the Samajwadi Party. He is a member of the 18th Uttar Pradesh Assembly, representing the Sagri Assembly constituency.

Early life and education 
Narayan's profession Surgeon & Partner Ramrati Hospital, Proprietor Ramrati Ultrasound Clinic. 

Hriday Narayan Singh Patel's educational qualifications are Post Graduate.

References

Year of birth missing (living people)
Samajwadi Party politicians from Uttar Pradesh
Uttar Pradesh MLAs 2022–2027
Living people